Peter Gentsch (born 1968 in Frankfurt am Main, Germany) is a German academic, researcher, author, management consultant and entrepreneur specialising in digital management and data science.

Career 
After obtaining his doctorate at the WHU – Otto Beisheim School of Management, Peter Gentsch was,  (from 2002 to 2004) Professor at the Technical University of Cologne (TH Cologne). Since 2004, Peter Gentsch has held the professorship for International Business Administration with a focus on digital management and data science at the Technical and Economic University of Applied Sciences in Aalen. In addition, he works as a docent and reviewer at the University of St. Gallen and at the WHU – Otto Beisheim School of Management. Gentsch is the author of several publications.

Entrepreneurial Activities 
In 2002, Peter Gentsch founded B.I.G. – Business Intelligence Group in Berlin, which now supports various companies (ConversionBoosting, intelliAd, etc.), as a shareholder and investor. In 2006 he took over TextTech GmbH. In 2012 the stock-exchange-registered USU Software AG acquired B.I.G. Social Media GmbH, founded by Peter Gentsch, which continues to operate as an independent unit after the takeover.

Peter Gentsch is also founder and executive board member of DATAlovers AG and founder and managing partner of Diva-e Digital Transformation Consulting GmbH.

In 2000, Peter Gentsch founded the Social Media Excellence-Circle (SME). This initiative currently has over 400 members from 180 companies. The initiative has set itself the aim of developing practice-derived solutions for core themes and problems relating to Social Media.

In addition, Peter Gentsch is the co-initiator of the Chief Digital Officer-Club (CDO), and of the Institute for Customer Experience Management i-CEM. From 2000 to 2008, Peter Gentsch was a member of the jury of the Data Mining Cup.

Peter Gentsch also founded the Digital Transformation Group, which in the meanwhile has been acquired by Diva-e.

In February 2020, Peter Gentsch was speaker on the 50th World Economic Forum in Davos. 

In 2021, Peter Gentsch founded the Institute for Conversational Business at Aalen University. The institute analyses and evaluates methods, technologies and procedures in the areas of messenger, chatbots, smart speakers and conversational AI on an empirically sound basis in order to enable clear expectation management and objective orientation for companies. on September 30, 2021, the Institute for Conversational Business hosted „The Conversational Business Summit“ as a hybrid event and attracted over 400 participants from 5 nations.

Awards 
 German Market Research Innovation Award: In 2010, Peter Gentsch, together with Lufthansa, won the German Market Research Innovation Award. The study Insight Mining – Modern Data Management Based on Text Mining Technology deals with the efficient handling of the multitude of information sources with which in-house market researchers are confronted on a daily basis.
 Digital Communication Award: In 2011, Gentsch, together with Deutsche Post/DHL, won the international Digital Communication Award in the category “Digital Monitoring and Evaluation”.
 German Award for Online Communication: In 2014, Peter Gentsch, together with Deutsche Post/DHL, won the German Award for Online Communication in the category “Internal Online Communication”.

Publications (extract) 
 AI in Marketing, Sales and Service - How Marketers without a Data Science Degree can use AI, Big Data and Bots. Palgrave Macmillan Cham. 2019. ISBN 978-3-319-89956-5  .
 Künstliche Intelligenz für Sales, Marketing und Service. Mit AI und Bots zu einem Algorithmic Business – Konzepte, Technologien und Best Practices. Wiesbaden: Gabler. 2018. ISBN 978-3-658-19146-7.

References 

1968 births
Living people
Businesspeople from Frankfurt
Academic staff of the Technical University of Cologne